The 139th Airlift Squadron (139 AS) is a unit of the New York Air National Guard 109th Airlift Wing Stationed at Stratton Air National Guard Base, Schenectady, New York. The 139th is equipped with the specialized ski-equipped LC-130H Hercules for polar operations.

History

World War II
Activated at Morris Field, North Carolina, receiving its initial cadre from the 20th Fighter Group. Initially Operated as an operational training squadron (OTU), flying P-39 Airacobras and P-43 Lancers with a mission to train newly graduated pilots from Training Command in single-engine fighter aircraft. Beginning in mid-1943 switched to replacement training (RTU), of pilots.   Equipment upgraded to P-47 Thunderbolts and lastly P-40 Warhawks.   Was disbanded in May 1944 with reorganization of training units, personnel and equipment absorbed by "Squadron B", 336th AAF Base Unit (Replacement Training Unit, Fighter).

New York Air National Guard

The wartime 303d Fighter Squadron was reconstituted and redesignated as the 139th Fighter Squadron, and was allotted to the New York Air National Guard, on 24 May 1946. It was organized at Schenectady County Airport, Schenectady, New York, and was extended federal recognition on 18 October 1948 by the National Guard Bureau. The 139th Fighter Squadron was bestowed the lineage, history, honors, and colors of the 303d Fighter Squadron. The squadron was equipped with F-47D Thunderbolts and was initially assigned to the New York ANG 52d Fighter Wing, later to the 107th Fighter Group in November 1948.

The mission of the 139th Fighter Squadron was the air defense of eastern and northern New York. Aircraft parts were no problem and many of the maintenance personnel were World War II veterans so readiness was quite high and the planes were often much better maintained than their USAF counterparts. In some ways, the postwar Air National Guard was almost like a flying country club and a pilot could often show up at the field, check out an aircraft and go flying. However, the unit also had regular military exercises that kept up proficiency and in gunnery and bombing contests they would often score at least as well or better than active-duty USAF units, given the fact that most ANG pilots were World War II combat veterans.

Air Defense mission

With the surprise invasion of South Korea on 25 June 1950, and the regular military's complete lack of readiness, most of the Air National Guard was federalized and placed on active duty. The 139th was retained by the State of New York to maintain the air defense mission. In 1951, the Thunderbolts were replaced by Very Long Range F-51H Mustangs, which were capable of extended air defense flights over all of New York State.

The air defense mission remained after the Korean War armistice and the unit resumed normal peacetime training and drills. In 1954, the Mustang was ending its service life and Air Defense Command was re-equipping its fighter-interceptor squadrons with jet aircraft. The 139th received F-94B Starfires, however the F-94 required a two-man aircrew, a pilot and an air observer, to operate its radar equipment. Trainees for the radar assignment had to attend regular Air Force Training Schools, and required virtually the same qualifications as the pilot trainees. The additional recruitment of guardsmen led to the units having a manning and capabilities problem that lasted for some time until the unit was returned to full readiness.

In 1956, the 107th Fighter-Interceptor Wing was reorganized and redesignated as the 107th Air Defense Wing. As a result, the 139th was authorized to expand to a group level, and the 109th Fighter Group (Air Defense) was established by the National Guard Bureau. The 139th TFS becoming the group's flying squadron. Other squadrons assigned into the group were the 109th Headquarters, 109th Material Squadron (Maintenance), 109th Combat Support Squadron, and the 105th USAF Dispensary. The F-86H Sabre replaced the F-94B Starfires in 1957.

A major change to the 107th Air Defense Wing in 1958 was the transition from an Air Defense Command (ADC) mission to Tactical Air Command (TAC) and a tactical fighter mission, the 109th being redesignated as a Tactical Fighter Group; and 139th also being redesignated. The new assignment involved a change in the Group's training mission to include high-altitude interception, air-to-ground rocketry, ground strafing and tactical bombing. The 139th TFS retained their F-86H Sabres.

Airlift mission
With air transportation recognized as a critical need, the 109th was redesignated the 109th Air Transport Group (Heavy) on 2 January 1960 and was transferred from TAC to the Military Air Transport Service (MATS). The 139th Air Transport Squadron was equipped with C-97 Stratofreighter intercontinental transports, with an Aeromedical Flight as a secondary mission. With the C-97s, the 109d augmented MATS airlift capability worldwide in support of the Air Force's needs in Europe.

During the 1961 Berlin Crisis, the 139th ATS was federalized on 1 October 1961. From Schenectady, the 139th ATS augmented MATS airlift capability worldwide in support of the Air Force's needs. It returned again to New York state control on 31 August 1962.

During the 1960s, the Group flew scheduled MATS transport missions to Europe, Africa the Caribbean and South America. On 8 January 1966, Military Air Transport Service became Military Airlift Command (MAC) and the units were redesignated as the 109th Military Airlift Group and 139th was redesignated as the 137th Military Airlift Squadron.

With the retirement of the C-97 in 1971, the 109th became a Tactical Airlift Group and the 139th Tactical Airlift Squadron received eight C-130A Hercules transports and was transferred from MAC to Tactical Air Command.

The first major mission of the C-130s was in June 1972 when the squadron provided relief assistance to storm victims of Tropical Storm Agnes. 109th crews gave around-the-clock support to relief efforts. Operating mainly from the Broome County Airport at Binghamton, 109th crews provided the lion's share of airlift into stricken areas, particularly Elmira, where surface transportation was cut off.   On 1 December 1974, the unit was transferred back to Military Airlift Command when MAC took over the tactical airlift mission from TAC, USAFE and PACAF air force wide.

DEW Line/Antarctic Research Mission Support
In 1975 the 107th was given a new mission for resupply of the Greenland Icecap's radar stations. The 109th was re-equipped with 5 C-130D Hercules, assuming responsibility for the Volant DEW Line resupply mission to the DYE-1, 2, 3 and DYE-4 stations. The 109th assumed the mission from the Air Force's Alaskan Air Command receiving their eleven C-130s, five of which were ski-equipped for landings on packed snow runways. In October 1984, the C-130D aircraft were replaced by eight new C-130H models, of which four were LC-130s (ski equipped).

In 1988 the 109th had been notified that, almost overnight, one of the Distant Early Warning (DEW) Line radar sites that it supported in Greenland was going to be shut down. The other sites would soon follow and the 109th would be largely out of business because its main mission had ended. The last flight to radar site DYE-3 in December 1989 marked the end of the DEW Line mission. The 107th assumed jurisdiction of the landing strip at the DYE-2 station for pilot training for practicing Antarctic takeoffs & landings (called Ice Station Ruby); a.k.a. the Raven Ski-way Training Facility.

After the closure of the Greenland stations, the experienced gained by the unit was transferred to its new mission; the airlift support to National Science Foundation's South Pole research program and the U.S. Navy's VXE-6 unit.   The 109th continued to augment the Navy's Antarctic flying operations for the next eight years. 

The 109th was not mobilized during the 1990 Gulf Crisis, however 109th AW members were called to duty in support of Operation Desert Shield/Operation Desert Storm. In March 1992, with the end of the Cold War, the 109th adopted the Air Force Objective Organization plan, and the unit was redesignated as the 109th Airlift Group. On 1 October 1995, in accordance with the Air Force "One Base – One Wing" policy, the 109th Airlift Wing was established and the 139th Airlift Squadron was assigned to the new 109th Operations Group. In September 1994 139th Aeromeds deployed to Rwanda in support of Operation Support Hope.

In mid-1996, the Air Force, in response to budget cuts, and changing world situations, began experimenting with Air Expeditionary organizations. The Air Expeditionary Force (AEF) concept was developed that would mix Active-Duty, Reserve and Air National Guard elements into a combined force. Instead of entire permanent units deploying as "Provisional" as in the 1991 Gulf War, Expeditionary units are composed of "aviation packages" from several wings, including active-duty Air Force, the Air Force Reserve Command and the Air National Guard, would be married together to carry out the assigned deployment rotation.

Early in 1996, it was announced that the 109th Airlift Wing was slated to assume that entire Antarctic mission from the U.S. Navy in 1999. The Antarctic operation would be fully funded by the NSF. On 20 February 1998, responsibility for airlift support to the United States Antarctic Program (USAP) was passed over to 109 AW from VXE-6, during a ceremony at Christchurch International Airport, Christchurch, New Zealand.

With the assumption of the support mission from the Navy, the 109th established an operating location at Christchurch and a forward location at Williams Field, on the Ross Ice Shelf, Antarctica. Williams provides support to the United States McMurdo Station and New Zealand's Scott Base.  

During October 1999 the 109th AW aided in the rescue of Dr. Jerri Nielsen, a doctor with breast cancer symptoms and based at isolated Amundsen–Scott South Pole Station in Antarctica.

Modern era
The 109th Wing's high operational tempo increased dramatically with the surprise attack on the World Trade Center on 11 September 2001. The 109th provided immediate support deploying 49 Civil Engineers, Services and Public Affairs personnel to Ground Zero within the first 24 hours. Since that time, the men and women of the 109th AW have continued to voluntarily deploy in support of military operations in Southwest Asia and around the world.

In its 2005 BRAC Recommendations, DoD recommended to realign the 109th Airlift Wing by transferring four C-130H aircraft to the 189th Airlift Wing, Little Rock AFB, AR. The LC-130 aircraft (ski-equipped) would remain at Schenectady.

The 139th Expeditionary Airlift Squadron deployed to Afghanistan in June 2007, marking the first time since Vietnam that aircraft from the unit flew their own aircraft in a combat theater of operations.

During the 2011–2012 season, crews flying six LC-130H Ski-Herk transports carried out 359 missions between McMurdo Station, Antarctica, and eighteen inland Antarctic destinations, transporting more than seven million pounds of cargo and fuel and more than 1,600 passengers. The LC-130H crews were also called on to provide aerial reconnaissance and communication links to a disabled Russian vessel, allowing for a Royal New Zealand Air Force C-130 crew to later airdrop three parcels on an ice floe next to the ailing ship

The wing has deployed an average of 150 on duty at any one time. The Airmen deploy for 30–60 days each, working two 12-hour shifts each week, running supplies and people to field camps across the continent and the South Pole station.

When the squadron is the primary force provider, the 139th Expeditionary Airlift Squadron is the designation of the forces deployed as part of an Air and Space Expeditionary unit after June 1996.

Lineage

 Constituted as the 303d Fighter Squadron (Single Engine) on 16 Ju1y 1942
 Activated on 23 July 1942
 Disbanded on 1 May 1944
 Reconstituted redesignated 139th Fighter Squadron, Single Engine and allotted to the Air National Guard on 24 May 1946.
 Activated and received federal recognition on 18 October 1948
 Redesignated: 139th Fighter-Interceptor Squadron on 1 October 1952
 Redesignated: 139th Tactical Fighter Squadron on 10 November 1958
 Redesignated: 139th Air Transport Squadron, Heavy on 2 January 1960
 Federalized and placed on active duty on 1 March 1961
 Released from active duty and returned to New York state control pm 1 December 1962
 Redesignated: 139th Military Airlift Squadron on 1 January 1966
 Redesignated: 139th Tactical Airlift Squadron c. 1 March 1971
 Redesignated: 139th Airlift Squadron on 15 March 1992

Assignments
 337th Fighter Group, 23 July 1942 – 1 May 1944
 107th Fighter Group (later 107th Fighter-Interceptor Group), 18 October 1948
 109th Fighter Group (later 109th Tactical Fighter Group, 109th Air Transport Group), 15 April 1956
 133d Air Transport Wing, 1 October 1961
 109th Air Transport Group (later 109th Military Airlift Group, 109th Tactical Airlift Group, 109th Airlift Group), 1 December 1962
 109th Operations Group, 1 October 1995 – present

Stations

 Morris Field, North Carolina, 23 July 1942
 Spartanburg Municipal Airport, South Carolina, 23 July 1942
 Sarasota Army Air Field, Florida, 20 August 1942
 Drew Field, Florida, 22 August 1942
 Sarasota Army Air Field, Florida, 5 Jan 1943 – 1 May 1944

 Schenectady County Airport (laterStratton Air National Guard Base), Schenectady, New York, 18 November 1948
 Operates from: Christchurch International Airport, Christchurch, New Zealand, 20 February 1998–Present
 Operates from: Williams Field, Antarctica, 1998–Present

Aircraft

 P-39 Airacobra, 1942
 P-43 Lancer, 1942
 P-47 Thunderbolt, 1943
 P-40 Warhawk, 1943–1944
 F-47D Thunderbolt, 1948–1952
 F-51H Mustang, 1952–1954
 F-94B Starfire, 1954–1957

 F-86H Sabre, 1957–1960
 C-97 Stratofreighter, 1960–1971
 C-130A Hercules, 1971–1975
 C-130D Hercules, 1975–1984
 C-130H Hercules, 1984–Present
 LC-130H Hercules, 1984–Present

Notes

References

Attribution

External links

Squadrons of the United States Air National Guard
Military units and formations in New York (state)
139